Millie Munro (born 1951) is a former netball player for the Silver Ferns, the New Zealand national netball team, who played for her country on 41 occasions, including at the 1975 and 1979 world championships.

Early life
Marilyn Margaret (Millie) Munro was born on 4 September 1951. Learning sewing from her mother, and making her own clothes, she then studied design at the Wellington High School. She began her working life as a machinist at a clothing factory, playing netball in her spare time. In 1980, together with a friend, she set up a garment-producing company, originally working from home before moving into premises in Wellington and working with New Zealand designers.

Netball career
Munro played netball at school and with the Wellington High School Old Girls team. She was selected for the Wellington Under-20 team in 1969 and 1970 and played in the Wellington senior side from 1971 to 1985. She was first selected for the national team in 1974, making her debut against Singapore in October of that year and forming a defensive pairing with Yvonne Willering. After touring to England she became part of the New Zealand team competing in the 1975 World Netball Championships, which were held in Auckland, New Zealand. The team finished third. In 1979 she played for the Silver Ferns in the world championships, which were held in Trinidad and Tobago. At that time there were no finals and the top ten teams played a Round-robin tournament that resulted in New Zealand, Australia and the hosts sharing the gold medal. The game against Trinidad and Tobago was controversial as Willering knocked over the local star Jean Pierre and the spectators became very aggressive. After the championships, Munro continued to play for the Silver Ferns until 1982.

References

1951 births
Living people
Sportspeople from Wellington City
New Zealand international netball players
1979 World Netball Championships players
1975 World Netball Championships players